The LGV Sud-Est (French: Ligne à Grande Vitesse Sud-Est; English: South East high-speed line) is a French high-speed rail line which connects the Paris and Lyon areas. It was France's first high-speed rail line. The inauguration of the first section between Saint-Florentin and Sathonay-Camp by President François Mitterrand on 22 September 1981 marked the beginning of the re-invigoration of French passenger rail service.

Other LGV projects have extended the reach of high-speed trains that use this line, including the LGV Rhône-Alpes and LGV Méditerranée to the south and the LGV Interconnexion Est to the north. These connecting lines shortened journey times between Paris and the southeast of France (Marseille, Montpellier and Nice), Switzerland and Italy, as well as between the southeast and the north and west of France, the United Kingdom and Belgium. The LGV Rhône-Alpes, Sud-Est and Méditerranée, taken as a whole, were also nicknamed the City To Coast (C2C) Highway ("Ville à la Mer").

Route
The line crosses six departments, from north to south:
Seine-et-Marne
Yonne
Côte-d'Or
Saône-et-Loire
Ain
Rhône

The TGV system is compatible with the regular rail network, avoiding the need for new infrastructure construction to reach existing train stations in the dense urban areas of Paris and Lyon.

There are no tunnels.

The line includes various connectors to the regular rail network:
at Pasilly-Aisy towards Dijon, and further through the Jura Mountains to Vallorbe and Lausanne or Neuchâtel and Zurich
at Mâcon-Pont-de-Veyle towards Bourg-en-Bresse and the Savoie department
at Saint-Florentin
at Le Creusot station
at Mâcon-Loché station
These last three are used by service trains or in order to divert passenger trains if needed.

For its full length, a -wide area has been reserved for a telecommunication artery.

Line specifics

In total, the line comprises  of track. This is formed by UIC 60 rails placed in  lengths, welded in place (with certain segmented sections). The  concrete sleepers are formed of two blocks of concrete tied together by a metal strut. There are 1660 sleepers per kilometre.

Traction power is supplied by eight EDF substations at 25 kV AC, 50 Hz. The catenary is fed by an inverted phase "feeder" cable, which is equivalent to a 50 kV supply and reinforces the available power, enabling a single trainset to draw up to 14 MW.

Signalling relies on high-frequency track circuits, signals being transmitted directly to the driver's console. There are lineside marker boards indicating the limits of each block section, but no signals as such.

This is near the range dividing the Seine and Loire river valleys, and not far from the Rhône river valley.

Stations
The LGV Sud-Est serves the following stations:
Le Creusot
Mâcon-Loché
Lyon Part-Dieu

Le-Creusot and Mâcon-Loché are basic stations situated away from built-up areas. They have four tracks, with the two central tracks being reserved for through trains, and the side tracks serving stopping trains on two side platforms.

Costs

From 1996, the track of the LGV Sud-Est was renewed at a cost of FRF 2 billion, or about €300 million.

History 
 10 July 1967: SNCF research launches project C 03 on high speed rail, titled "Rail Transport Possibilities through New Infrastructure"
 26 March 1971: new line project approved by inter-ministerial committee
 23 March 1976: declaration of public utility signed by Prime Minister Jacques Chirac
 7 December 1976: works commence at Écuisses, Saône-et-Loire
 14 June 1979: first rails laid near Montchanin, Saône-et-Loire
 20 November 1980: track laying ends in Cluny, Saône-et-Loire
 26 February 1981: trainset no. 16 (SNCF TGV Sud-Est) breaks the world record for rail speed at 380 km/h between Courcelles-Frémoy, Côte-d'Or and Dyé, Yonne in a gradually descending portion of the line
 22 September 1981: inauguration of the first section (Saint-Florentin to Montchanin) by the President of the Republic, François Mitterrand
 27 September 1981: commercial service begins
 25 September 1983: service begins on the northern section (Combs-la-Ville to Saint-Florentin)
 31 August 1992: derailment at 270 km/h of a TGV in Macon-Loché station; several passengers waiting on the platform are slightly injured by flying ballast
 13 December 1992: service begins on northern section of LGV Rhône-Alpes (Montanay to Saint-Quentin-Fallavier)
 26 May 1994: service begins on LGV Interconnexion Est (connection with LGV Nord)
 March 1996: beginning of line renovation works (replacement of ballast and points, works designed to last until 2006)
 2 June 1996: service begins at the junction with Villeneuve-Saint-Georges by the Coubert triangle

See also
 TGV

References

External links 
 High-speed rail lines site (in French)

Sud-Est
Railway lines opened in 1981
Railway lines opened in 1983